Sir Edward Wingfield Verner, 4th Baronet (1 October 1830 – 21 June 1899) was a Conservative Party politician in Ireland who sat in the House of Commons of the United Kingdom from 1863 to 1880.

Verner was the second son of Sir William Verner, Bt (1782–1871) and his wife Harriet Wingfield. He was educated at Eton College and Christ Church, Oxford. He married Selina Florence, daughter of Thomas Vesey Nugent, on 15 December 1864.

Verner was elected as the Member of Parliament (MP) for Lisburn in 1863.  He contested a by-election in February of that year, and was narrowly defeated by the Liberal Party candidate, industrialist John Doherty Barbour. However, that result was overturned on petition and at a second by-election in June he won the seat by 151 votes to Barbour's 90.

Verner held the Lisburn seat until 1873. His father William had been one of the two MPs for County Armagh, and on William's death Edward resigned his seat to stand in the by-election for Armagh. He was elected unopposed, and re-elected with a generous majority in 1874. He stood down at the 1880 general election, when his nephew William Edward was defeated by the Liberal candidate James Nicholson Richardson.

Outside of Parliament, Verner was High Sheriff of County Dublin in 1866. He lived at Corke Abbey, County Wicklow, and died on 21 June 1899.

Arms

References

External links 
 

1830 births
1899 deaths
Irish Conservative Party MPs
UK MPs 1859–1865
UK MPs 1865–1868
UK MPs 1868–1874
UK MPs 1874–1880
Younger sons of baronets
Members of the Parliament of the United Kingdom for County Antrim constituencies (1801–1922)
Members of the Parliament of the United Kingdom for County Armagh constituencies (1801–1922)
People educated at Eton College
Alumni of Christ Church, Oxford
Baronets in the Baronetage of the United Kingdom
High Sheriffs of County Dublin